Maritime Administration of DPR Korea, also known as North Korea Maritime Administration Bureau (MAB), is the North Korean maritime authority.

MAB offers a searchable database for North Korean merchant navy ships and seafarers on its website. Unlike many other shipping databases, MAB offers its ship and person data without requiring registration or membership for access.

The director-general of MAB in 2012 was Ko Nung-du. He signed the notification for International Maritime Organization about the Kwangmyŏngsŏng-3 launch.

MAB has a sports team in the annual Paektusan Prize Games of Civil Servants.

See also
Rajin University of Marine Transport

References

Further reading

Spokesman for Maritime Administration of DPRK on "Oil Tanker Incident" in Libya at KCNA (archived)
North Korea denies responsibility for oil-tanker near Libya at NK News
Website appears for LRIT maritime system at North Korea Tech

External links

International Maritime Law Institute directory on The Democratic People's Republic of Korea 

Maritime transport authorities
Merchant navy
Merchant ships of North Korea
Water transport in North Korea